The Hunku Glacier is located in the Khumbu of eastern Nepal and forms the southern base of Baruntse (7,220 m).

See also
 List of glaciers

References 

Glaciers of Nepal